Atger may refer to:
Laval-Atger, a former French commune
Virginie Atger (born 1984), French equestrian
Stéphanie Atger (born 1975), French politician

Disambiguation pages
Disambiguation pages with surname-holder lists